La Souterraine (Limousin: La Sotarrana) is a commune in the Creuse department in the Nouvelle-Aquitaine region in central France.

Geography
La Souterraine is an area of farming and light industry, comprising the town and a few small hamlets. It is also served by a TER railway link.
The small river Sédelle, a tributary of the Creuse, flows through the town. 
The sources of the Benaize, a tributary of the Anglin, and the Brame, a tributary of the Gartempe, are both in the commune.

History
There is evidence of pre-Roman occupation here, attested by the discovery of Stone Age tools and a menhir. Remains of Roman villas and temples have been unearthed. In medieval times, a church and fortified walls were built. The name of the town, translating as ‘subterranean’, comes from the underground parts of the church, the crypt.

Population

Sights
 The church dating from the 11th century, with its Roman crypt.
 The 15th-century Manorhouse de Châteaurenaud.
 The 13th-century gate, the Porte de St.Jean, and the rest of the ramparts.
 A feudal motte, circular tower and the castle at Bridiers.
 The 18th-century chapel of the hospital.
 The ancient chapel of Sainte-Eutrope.
 The 14th-century church at Bussière-Madeleine.

See also
Communes of the Creuse department

References

External links
 Official website of La Souterraine 

Communes of Creuse
County of La Marche